Gastón Puerari  (born 23 January 1986 in Paysandú) is an Uruguayan footballer who most recently played for Plaza Colonia.

Career

Uruguay
Puerari, a diminutive striker who can play as a left or right winger, started his career with Selección de Paysandú. After impressing several First Division clubs he joined Rampla Juniors in 2007. With Rampla Juniors Puerari appeared in 30 league matches and scored 6 goals. During the 2008 season he was loaned to top Ecuadorian club Emelec. Following a short stint in the Ecuadorian top flight he returned to Rampla Juniors.

In 2009, he joined Montevideo Wanderers and quickly established himself as a key player for the top Uruguayan side. In the 2010 Apertura season Puerari scored 5 goals in fourteen matches with Wanderers.

United States
On February 3, 2011 it was announced that Puerari was joining Chicago Fire in Major League Soccer. After starting off very well with the MLS club, Puerari failed to impress.

Mexico
On June 15, 2011, having played just fourteen MLS games for Chicago, it was announced that Puerari had been sold to Club Atlas in Primera División de México.

References

External links

1986 births
Living people
Footballers from Paysandú
Uruguayan expatriate footballers
Uruguayan footballers
Association football forwards
Rampla Juniors players
C.S. Emelec footballers
Montevideo Wanderers F.C. players
Chicago Fire FC players
Atlas F.C. footballers
Defensor Sporting players
El Tanque Sisley players
Juventud de Las Piedras players
Club Plaza Colonia de Deportes players
Uruguayan Primera División players
Major League Soccer players
Liga MX players
Expatriate soccer players in the United States
Expatriate footballers in Mexico
Expatriate footballers in Ecuador
Uruguayan expatriate sportspeople in the United States
Uruguayan expatriate sportspeople in Mexico
Uruguayan expatriate sportspeople in Ecuador